Archephanes is a genus of moths in the family Geometridae with a single species.

Species
 Archephanes zalosema Turner, 1926

References
 Archephanes at Markku Savela's Lepidoptera and Some Other Life Forms

Nacophorini
Geometridae genera
Monotypic moth genera